Eid Daahir Faarah or Ciid is an Ethiopian politician who was the president of the  Somali Region of Ethiopia from 1995 to 1997. He severd as in the Somali regional parliament and was a member of the ruling Somali Democratic League, Ethiopian Somali Democratic League (ESDL).

Life
Eid was born in 1961, in Harshin, Ethiopia, then a part of Hawd and Reserve Area. He hails from the Sa'ad Musa sub-division of the Habar Awal clan of Isaaq.

References 

Ethiopian politicians
1961 births
Living people